Tomkin is the surname of the following people
Albert Tomkin (1915–1989), English football player
Maxim Tomkin (born 1992), Russian ice hockey defenceman
William Tomkin (1860–1940), English painter

See also
Tomkins (disambiguation)
Tomkin Road railway station in Ireland
Tomkin Tomato (Variety)